Antigua is a rural locality in the Fraser Coast Region, Queensland, Australia.

Geography 
The Mary River is the eastern boundary of the locality and Myrtle Creek is the southern boundary.

The North Coast railway line passes through the locality from south to north. The locality was once served by the Antigua railway station, but it is now abandoned.

History

Antigua State School opened on 20 August 1918 and closed on 31 March 1937.

Education 
There are no schools in Antigua. The nearest government primary school is Mungar State School in neighbouring Mungar to the north. The nearest government secondary school is Aldridge State High School in Maryborough to the north-west.

Amenities 

Antigua Community Hall is on Mungar Road.

References

Fraser Coast Region
Localities in Queensland